The Saga Continues may refer to:

 The Saga Continues... (Roger Troutman album), 1984
 The Saga Continues..., 2001 by P. Diddy and The Bad Boy Family
 The Saga Continues (Wu-Tang Clan album), 2017